Dominick Tavella is an American sound engineer. He has been sound mixing since 1976 and specializes in balancing and recording the final soundtrack in its many formats for film, TV, and documentaries.  D.A. Pennebaker was one of his college instructors who eventually became his mentor and later connected him to his first sound job. His first Union was as a transfer engineer, later a re-recording engineer, at DuArt Film Laboratory in New York City. There he mixed documentaries and low budget feature films. In 1988, Tavella joined Sound One where he built his reputation among clients such as Paul Schrader, Jim Jarmusch, Darren Aronofsky, Ric Burns, and Ken Burns. His documentaries, Jazz and New York were both nominated for Emmys for best sound. In 2003, he won an Oscar for Best Sound Mixing and a BAFTA for best sound for the film Chicago. He has worked on more than 180 films since 1981.

Filmography

References

External links

Year of birth missing (living people)
Living people
American audio engineers
Best Sound Mixing Academy Award winners
Best Sound BAFTA Award winners